Conan the Cimmerian may refer to:

 Conan the Barbarian, Robert E. Howard's fictional character
 Conan the Cimmerian (comics), Dark Horse Comics series about that character
 The Coming of Conan the Cimmerian, an anthology collection of Robert E. Howard's short stories

See also
 Conan (disambiguation)
 Conan of Cimmeria (disambiguation)
 Conan the Adventurer (disambiguation)
 Conan the Barbarian (disambiguation)
 Conan the Conqueror (disambiguation)
 Conan the Destroyer (disambiguation)
 Cimmeria (disambiguation)